This is a list of islands of Malawi.

Lake Malawi 

 Chizumulu Island
 Likoma Island

Lake Chilwa 

 Chilwa Island - inhabited
 Tongwe Island - inhabited

Lake Malombe

References

Islands
Malawi